The Shoe People is an animated television series which was first broadcast in the UK in April 1987 on TV-am. It went on to be broadcast in 62 countries around the world.

It was the first series from the West to be shown in the former Soviet Union and became so popular there that it sold over 25 million Shoe People books.

The Shoe People was created by James Driscoll, who got the inspiration for the show from noticing that the style and appearance of people's shoes revealed things about their owners' personalities. He then wondered what stories these shoes could tell about themselves when they were new and when they had gradually worn out.

The theme song was written and sung by Justin Hayward of The Moody Blues.

The story 
In a shoe repair shop, a shoe mender tries to repair all the shoes he gets, but sometimes he cannot repair them all. He does not throw away these shoes; he puts them in the back room of the shop.

These join the other shoes and boots he could not bear to throw away and the ones where their owners never came back for them. This room has a secret. Every night when the shoe mender locks up the shop, he makes sure the back room door is shut. This door does not shut very easily and when he slams it shut, the strangest thing happens. A large cloud of dust from the room fills the air and when it settles, the shoes come to life and the back wall disappears and Shoe Town appears.

Just below Toecap Hill is Shoe Town, where all the shoes and boots live.

The characters were voiced by Philip Whitchurch and Jo Wyatt (Olwen Rees in Welsh). Jo does the female voices in the sequel, The New Adventures of the Shoe People, while Phillip does all the male voices. Jo's father Martin also produced a vinyl record of the series as well as owning Bright Music, the company that produces the music for the series.

Characters

Original characters
 P.C. Boot – he is the policeman of Shoe Town and lives in 'Shoe Street Police Station'. Like any good policeman, he is dedicated to his duty of maintaining law and order. He is very formal and likes to over-explain things, to the annoyance of others. He talks with a little bit of a lisp. He is voiced by Philip Whitchurch.
 Charlie – on the corner of Shoe Street lives Charlie, a clown. He lives in a circus tent called 'The Little Big Top'. He likes to perform magic tricks and juggling, but best of all, he likes to make people laugh. The Shoe People have to be careful when talking to him, as he either pulls a face, or squirts water at them through his fake flower. He seems to have many unusual ideas that are useful for helping others in Shoe Town. He is voiced by Philip Whitchurch.
 Trampy – he is a worn out Irish boot that has a hole in its toecap and he is a bit scruffy. He lives next door to Charlie in a house, with a crooked chimney, called 'Tumbledown House', which has not been painted or maintained in years and the garden is overgrown. He loves to relax and enjoy his natural garden. He is good-natured and friendly and likes to keep the peace between the other inhabitants of Shoe Town. He likes to go on walks in the country with Margot and Baby Bootee and tell them stories. Plus he likes his friends from the countryside to come for tea. He has had a soft spot for Margot, ever since he laid eyes on her. It has been speculated that Trampy – being Irish and dishevelled – is actually a gypsy or traveller who has left his travelling roots behind. He is voiced by Philip Whitchurch.
 Sergeant Major – he lives in 'Drill Hall' and still thinks he is in the army; he was in the Foot Regiment. He likes everything to be neat and tidy and shouts a lot. The grass in his garden is mown in perfect lines, he even measures the width of them, and all the plants stand to attention. The trouble is, he lives next door to Trampy, and gets very cross when the overgrown garden next door grows into his garden. At least once a day he complains to Trampy about it, but never takes any real action. He often calls Charlie "Stupid Clown", but he always comes to watch his circus act. He hates being called Sarge. Despite his grumpy, bossy manner, he does have a soft side which he rarely shows. He is voiced by Philip Whitchurch.
 Margot – she is a ballerina who lives in Swan Lake Cottage and she loves to dance. She looks after Baby Bootee. When she first arrived at the Shoe Repair Shop, she had a big tear in her side and she thought she would never dance again. Luckily for her the Shoe Repairer had other ideas and he fixed her. She was then put back into the window of the shop to wait for the little girl who brought her in, to collect her, but she never came back. Now she has a new life in Shoe Town and she loves to put on shows for everyone. She is voiced by Philip Whitchurch in the 1987 series and Jo Wyatt in the 1992 series.
 Wellington – he loves being wet and lives in 'Puddle Villa'. He loves water so much that he has drilled holes in the guttering of his house and stands underneath it when it rains. He hates being called a Welly. He is voiced by Philip Whitchurch.
 Baby Bootee – she is looked after by Margot at Swan Lake Cottage. She does not do much else, apart from loving the Teddy that Charlie won for her at the fair. She is voiced by Philip Whitchurch in the 1987 series and Jo Wyatt in the 1992 series.
 Sneaker – he likes to sneak around and he takes things without asking people, hence why he looks like a burglar and talks a sneaky tone of voice. He also likes to do odd jobs for people. There is a wanted poster of him on the outside of 'Shoe Street Police Station'. He has his own yard and his catchphrase is, "Sneaker by name, sneaker by nature!" He is voiced by Philip Whitchurch.
 Gilda Van Der Clog – she is a Dutch clog who lives in a windmill and needed Charlie and P.C. Boot's help to remove the nest from her windmill sails, and then made a picnic for all the shoes after their mystery tour. She is voiced by Philip Whitchurch in the 1987 series and Jo Wyatt in the 1992 series.
 Flip Flop – a flip-flop that went to the seaside with Trampy, Sergeant Major, Baby Bootee and Charlie. When she got swept away by the tide, Charlie (with his shoelace) and Trampy pulled her to safety on the rocks. She is voiced by Philip Whitchurch in the 1987 series and Jo Wyatt in the 1992 series.
 Mr Potter – the station master of The Shoe Town Railway Station who rang up P.C. Boot to warn him about a tree fallen along the railway tracks and nearly cancelled the trip before cheeky Charlie bought an elephant called Bertha to help remove the tree. He is the only original character who doesn't make any appearances in The New Adventures of the Shoe People. He is voiced by Philip Whitchurch.
 Sid Slipper – the elderly slipper who sometimes went to the park with The Shoe People like on that day when Baby Bootee crawls off to the flying kites whilst he was snoozing away under a tree and Margot was getting ice cream. In The New Adventures of the Shoe People, he owns his own garden and vegetable garden. He is voiced by Philip Whitchurch.
 Marshall – a cowboy who loves country and western music, loves Wild West films and does a safekeeping around Shoetown. He is voiced by Philip Whitchurch.

New characters
 Beverley – she comes all the way from LA to Shoetown that she is an American beauty. Beverley likes cheerleading and wears a gorgeous blonde ponytail in her hair and earrings on her sides. She is voiced by Jo Wyatt.
 Bebop and Alula – the 1950s couple who loves to dance to rock 'n' roll music. Bebop has his hair like Elvis Presley and Alula has her hair up in a ponytail. They appeared in the old series but weren't named until The New Adventures of the Shoe People. They are a bit like Danny and Sandy from a musical Grease. Bebop is voiced by Philip Whitchurch and Alula is voiced by Jo Wyatt.
 Morris is a miner who works in the underground in Shoetown. He loves digging and even has a light on his hard hat. He is voiced by Philip Whitchurch.
 Toby is the world's best actor and loves theatrical stuff. He always has a good personality about performs works of Shakespeare. He is voiced by Philip Whitchurch.
 Dr. Merryweather is a doctor in Shoetown who takes care of the residents in Shoetown and make them feel better. He is voiced by Philip Whitchurch.
 Sacha – a Russian boot comes all the way from Russia. He is voiced by Philip Whitchurch.
 Farmer Fred – a farmer who works on the farm. He is voiced by Philip Whitchurch.
 Coach – he likes sport like baseball. He is voiced by Philip Whitchurch.
 Officer Malone – a cop from New York City who works with P.C. Boot. When he first arrived in Shoe Town he arrested most of the Shoe People for what he thought were trouble making however he let them go after P.C. Boot told him that the real trouble makers were the Boot Boys. He is voiced by Philip Whitchurch.
 The Boot Boys are a trio of roller skates sometimes referred to as The Rollerskate Gang. The Boot Boys are Spike the leader, Ace the silly one, and Rowdy the dopey one. They love to cause trouble in Shoetown and are always up to no good. They are voiced by Philip Whitchurch.

Original episodes 
The first series consisted of 26 episodes which were broadcast on TV-am as part of its 'Wide Awake Club' from April 1987.

The New Adventures of the Shoe People 
A second series, The New Adventures of the Shoe People, showcasing many of the new characters, was broadcast on TVAM in 1992.

American dub 
The Shoe People was broadcast in the United States on Nickelodeon as a segment on their television series for preschoolers Eureeka's Castle. The series was redubbed with American accents and a female narrator, and a female voice actress was added to the voice cast.

Changes by Nick Jr. 
When all 26 episodes of The Shoe People in 1987 aired on Nick Jr. UK from 2001 to 2002, the Fairwater Films/The Shoe People Ltd copyright in 1987 was replaced by FilmFair Ltd, with the restoration handled by CiNAR Studios UK. FilmFair's copyright can be seen at the end of each episode on The Shoe People Complete Series DVD. The same FilmFair copyright screen can also be seen on the 1992 version of the said programme, also on Nick Jr. UK, when they aired the later series in spring 2002.

VHS releases
Since their broadcasts on TV-am in 1987, Tempo Video (with its 'Children's Stories' range of cartoon shows on video and distributed by M.S.D Video Ltd) released 24 of the 26 episodes on video, except for "The Mystery Tour" and "Our Very Own Circus" which went on a 30-minute video in 1988 (Cat No.V8805) with Sgt Major, Margot, Sneaker and Trampy's Dream.

Between 1989 and 1990 W.m. Collins Sons and Co.Ltd released a couple of special edition videos.

In late 1989, MSD Video Ltd released a single video containing eight stories from the series which was distributed by Wm. Collins for and on behalf of Avon Cosmetics.

On 5 November 1990, Wienerworld Presentations released two combined videos with 13 stories on each.

There were no video releases of The New Adventures of the Shoe People (1992 series). The first series is available on DVD. Other products included books and plush toys along with a special edition chocolate bar issued by Cadbury.

Title by country  
 English: The Shoe People (1987–1988) 
 Welsh: Pobl Tresgidie (1991)
 Croatian: Cipelići (1993)
 Russian: Город башмачков
 Slovenian: Šolenčki
 Icelandic: Skófólkið

International broadcast 
 CITV, The Children's Channel and S4C – United Kingdom
 ABC, ABC Kids, Ten Network and Nickelodeon – Australia
 TV2 – New Zealand

Computer game 
A children's educational computer game, First Class with the Shoe People, was released for various platforms in 1991 by Gremlin Interactive.

References

External links
 The Shoe People at Facebook
 

1980s British children's television series
1987 British television series debuts
1988 British television series endings
1980s British animated television series
British children's animated adventure television series
British children's animated fantasy television series
ITV children's television shows
Nick Jr. original programming
Television series by FilmFair
Television series by DHX Media
English-language television shows